Solid Ground is the thirteenth studio album by American country music artist John Anderson. It was released in 1993 under BNA Records. The album includes the singles "Money in the Bank" (his final Number One hit), I've Got It Made", "I Fell in the Water", and "I Wish I Could Have Been There". Also included is "Bad Love Gone Good", which was written by Dave Robbins, Van Stephenson, and Henry Paul, who comprised the band BlackHawk at the time. They later recorded this song on their 1995 album Strong Enough.

Track listing

ATrack omitted from cassette version.

Personnel
 John Anderson - lead vocals, background vocals, electric guitar (track 9)
 Eddie Bayers - drums 
 Barry Beckett - Hammond B-3 organ
 Larry Byrom - acoustic guitar
 Buddy Emmons - steel guitar
 Sonny Garrish - steel guitar, Dobro
 Dann Huff - electric guitar
 Gary Prim - piano
 Matt Rollings - piano
 Gary Smith - keyboards
 Joe Spivey - fiddle, mandolin, banjo
 James Stroud - drums (track 9)
 Glenn Worf - bass guitar
 Curtis Wright - background vocals
 Curtis "Mr. Harmony" Young - background vocals

Chart performance

References

John Anderson (musician) albums
1993 albums
BNA Records albums
Albums produced by James Stroud